Connect  is a South Korean streaming television series directed by Takashi Miike, starring Jung Hae-in, Go Kyung-pyo, and Kim Hye-jun. Based on a webtoon of the same name, the series depicts a mysterious story that occurs when a man who has been deprived of a part of his body by organ hunters, connects with a person who has received an organ transplant. It premiered on Disney+ on December 7, 2022.

Synopsis 
A new human being, Connect, who has an immortal body, was kidnapped by an organ trafficking organization. Part way through the surgery, he suddenly wakes up on an operating table  and manages to escape with his one remaining eye. Then he finds out that he can still see out of his missing eye, which has now been transplanted to a serial killer who killed and turned his victims into an artistic sculptures. Determined to get back what was taken, Dong-soo pursues the killer to make himself whole again.

In the end, Dong-soo succeed in taking down the killer but stopped at the last minute by a detective before he kills the killer. He and another Connect are then approached by several Apache Helicopters from the military as they are apprehended by the government.

Cast

Main 
 Jung Hae-in as Ha Dong-soo
 An immortal humanoid who lost one eye.
 Go Kyung-pyo as Oh Jin-seop
 A serial killer who received an eye transplant from Connect.
 Kim Hye-jun as Choi I-rang
 A mysterious helper who knows the secret of Connect

Supporting

Police 
 Kim Roi-ha as Detective Choi  
 Han Tae-hee as Detective Yeom

Organ Trafficking Gang 
 Jang Gwang as doctor
 Jo Bok-rae as Mr. Kim
 Sung Hyuk as Min-sook

Other 
 Yang Dong-geun as musician Z
 Oh Ha-nee as Song Ha-young

Production 
In June 2021, Studio Dragon announced that they were preparing to produce a new drama titled Connect with Japanese director Takashi Miike. The series is the first South Korean drama to be produced by a Japanese director.

In January 2022, it was reported that filming of the series was in progress. Filming reportedly ended in March 2022.

Release 
The series premiered at 27th Busan International Film Festival in "Onscreen Section" on October 6, 2022, where the first three episodes were screened.

All the 6 episodes of Connect were released on December 7, 2022, on Disney+.

Episode list

References

External links 
 
 Connect at Studio Dragon 
  at Studio HIM 
 
 
 Connect at Daum 

Star (Disney+) original programming
Disney+ original programming
Korean-language television shows
2022 South Korean television series debuts
Psychological thriller television series
South Korean fantasy television series
South Korean mystery television series
South Korean suspense television series
South Korean thriller television series
Television shows based on South Korean webtoons
Organ trade in fiction
Television series by Studio Dragon